Okiseius is a genus of mites in the Phytoseiidae family.

Species
 Okiseius alniseius Wainstein & Beglyarov, 1972
 Okiseius chinensis Wu, in Wu & Qian 1983
 Okiseius cowbay Walter, 1999
 Okiseius eharai Liang & Ke, 1982
 Okiseius formosanus Tseng, 1972
 Okiseius himalayana Gupta, 1986
 Okiseius juglandis (Wang & Xu, 1985)
 Okiseius maritimus (Ehara, 1967)
 Okiseius morenoi Schicha, 1987
 Okiseius sikkimensis Gupta, 1986
 Okiseius subtropicus Ehara, 1967
 Okiseius tibetagramins (Wu, 1987)
 Okiseius tribulation Walter, 1999
 Okiseius wongi Denmark & Kolodochka, in Kolodochka & Denmark 1996
 Okiseius yazuliensis Gupta, 1986

References

Phytoseiidae